This is a list of notable people who were born or have lived in Rostov-on-Don, Russia.

Born in Rostov-on-Don

19th century

1801–1890 
 George VI of Armenia (1868–1954), Catholicos of the Armenian Apostolic Church from 1945 to 1954
 Mikhail Bernshtein (1875–1960), Russian and Soviet painter and art educator
 Martiros Saryan (1880–1972), Soviet Armenian painter
 Mikhail Gnessin (1883–1957), Russian composer and teacher
 Raïssa Maritain (1883–1960), Russian-born French poet and philosopher
 Alexander Schapiro (1883–1946), Russian Jewish anarcho-syndicalist militant active in the international anarchist movement
 Sophie Liebknecht (1884–1964), Russian-born German socialist and feminist
 Sabina Spielrein (1885–1942), Russian physician and one of the first female psychoanalysts
 Jerzy Żurawlew (1886–1980), Polish pianist, conductor, teacher
 Savielly Tartakower (1887–1956), Polish and French chess grandmaster
 Efrem Zimbalist (1889–1985), concert violinist, composer, teacher, conductor and director of the Curtis Institute of Music

1891–1900 
 Yakov Frenkel (1894–1952), Soviet physicist
 Zinaida Reich (1894–1939), Russian actress
 Nikolay Bestchetvertnoi (1895–1937), Russian revolutionary, bolshevik
 Olga Spessivtseva (1895–1991), Russian ballerina
 Daniel Guilet (1899–1990), French and American classical violinist
 Avet Ter-Gabrielyan (1899–1983), Armenian violinist
 Izabella Yurieva (1899–2000), Russian singer
 Roman Chatov (1900–1987), Russian-born American artist, painter, designer, and illustrator
 Evgeny Henkin (1900-1938), a notable photographer and musician playing the theremin, active in Berlin in the 1930s

20th century

1901–1910 
 Marion Gering (1901–1977), Russian-born American stage producer and director
 Boris Shpitalniy (1902–1972), Soviet designer of aircraft guns and cannons
 Yevgeny Brusilovsky (1905–1981), Soviet Russian composer
 Vera Panova (1905–1973), Soviet novelist, playwright and journalist
 Leonid Sedov (1907–1999), leading physicist of the Soviet Union
 Rostislav Plyatt (1908–1989), Russian-born Soviet film and television actor
 John Travlos (1908–1985), Greek architect, architectural historian and archaeologist
 Caesar Kunikov (1909–1943), officer in the Soviet Naval Infantry; Hero of the Soviet Union
 Aleksandr Laktionov (1910–1972), Socialist realism painter in the post-war Soviet Union
 David Lichine (1910–1972), Russian-American ballet dancer and choreographer
 Yakov Henkin (1903-1941), notable Russian street photographer, active in Leningrad in the 1930s

1911–1920 
 Emmanuil Evzerikhin (1911–1984), Russian photographer
 Vitali Gubarev (1912–1981), Soviet Russian writer of children's literature
 Ray Lev (1912–1968), American classical pianist
 Nikolai Timkov (1912–1993), Soviet Russian painter
 Igor Bondarevsky (1913–1979), Soviet Russian chess Grandmaster
 Georgy Flyorov (1913–1990), Soviet nuclear physicist
 Gayane Chebotaryan (1918–1998), Soviet and Armenian composer and musicologist
 Boris Lavrenko (1920–2001), Russian Soviet realist painter
 Ghazaros (Lazar) Saryan (1920–1998), Armenian composer and educator

1921–1930 
 Isabella Bashmakova (1921–2005), Russian historian of mathematics
 Mark Stolberg (1922–1942), Russian chess master
 Daniil Khrabrovitsky (1923–1980), Soviet scriptwriter and film director
 Victor Glushkov (1923–1982), the founding father of information technology in the Soviet Union
 Leonid Shamkovich (1923–2005), Russian chess Grandmaster and chess writer
 Gevork Vartanian (1924–2012), Soviet intelligence agent
 Zinaida Sharko (born 1929), Soviet and Russian actress of theatre and film
 Mikhail Simonov (1929–2011), Russian aircraft designer famed for creating the Sukhoi Su-27 fighter-bomber
 Ashot Melkonian (1930–2009), Armenian artist

1931–1940 
 Yuri Oganessian (born 1933), Russian nuclear physicist of Armenian descent, namesake of oganesson (element 118)
 Mikhail Semyonov (1933–2006), Russian basketball player
 Lev Anninsky (born 1934), Soviet, Russian literary critic and historian, publicist, essayist, author of more than 30 books
 Anatoly Kononenko (born 1935), Soviet sprint canoer
 Sergei Vronsky (1935–2003), Soviet and Russian cinematographer
 Izabella Arazova (born 1936), Armenian composer
 Seiran Khatlamadjian (1937–1994), Armenian painter, graphic artist and public figure
 Gennadi Matveyev (1937–2014), Soviet football player
 Viktor Ponedelnik (born 1937), Soviet football player, regarded as one of the best strikers in Soviet football history
 Lev Sandakchiev (1937–2006), Soviet and Russian scientist, specialist in molecular biology and virology
 Viktor Zubkov (born 1937), Soviet basketball player
 Enver Yulgushov (born 1938), Russian professional football coach and former player

1941–1950 
 Stefan Samko (born 1941), Russian mathematician
 Nikolay Yakovenko (1941–2006), Russian wrestler
 Viktor Kravchenko (born 1941), Russian triple jumper
 Vladimir Shumeyko (born 1945), Russian political figure
 Alexander Kaidanovsky (1946–1995), Soviet and Russian actor and film director
 Nikolai Korolkov (born 1946), Soviet equestrian and Olympic champion
 Viktor Asmaev (1947–2002), equestrian and Olympic champion from Russia
 Lyudmila Karachkina (born 1948), Soviet and Ukrainian astronomer
 Georgy Khazagerov (born 1949), Russian scholar
 Aleksandr Ivanov-Sukharevsky (born 1950), far right politician

1951–1960 
 Irina Allegrova (born 1952), Russian-Armenian singer
 Yevgeniya Glushenko (born 1952), Russian actress
 Nikolai Sorokin (1952–2013), Russian theatre and film actor
 Yuri Bashmet (born 1953), Russian conductor, violinist and violist
 Pavel Gusev (born 1953), Russian professional football coach and a former player
 Evgeni Barbakov (born 1954), Russian rower
 Vladimir Repyev (1956–2009), Soviet and Russian handball player
 Viktor Kolyadko (born 1957), Russian professional football coach and a former player
 Svetlana Grozdova (born 1959), Soviet Russian gymnast
 Lyubov Orechova (born 1959), Soviet sprint canoer
 Sviatoslav Nikitenko (born 1960), Ukrainian glyptic artist

1961–1970 
 Konstantin Lavronenko (born 1961), Russian actor
 Miroslav Nemirov (1961–2016), Russian poet, associated with Russian punk rock
 Natalia Shaposhnikova (born 1961), Soviet gymnast, two-time Olympic Champion
 Avdey Ter-Oganyan (born 1961), Russian-Armenian painter
 Lyubov Zakharchenko (1961–2008), Russian poet and singer-songwriter
 Stanislav Rudenko (born 1962), Russian football coach and a former player
 Aleksandr Vorobyov (born 1962), Soviet and Russian football player and current coach
 Natalya Artyomova (born 1963), Russian middle-distance runner
 Rafael Samurgashev (born 1963), Soviet Armenian former World champion and European champion Greco-Roman wrestler
 Sergey Zhigunov (born 1963), Soviet and Russian actor and producer
 Igor Vishnevetsky (born 1964), Russian poet and novelist
 Gennadiy Prigoda (born 1965), Russian freestyle swimmer
 Natalya Morskova (born 1966), Russian former handball player
 Andrei Timoshenko (1969–2010), Russian professional footballer
 Larisa Kiselyova (born 1970), Russian handball player
 Oleh Matveyev (born 1970), Soviet and Ukrainian football player
 Vladimir Pyshnenko (born 1970), Russian freestyle swimmer

1971–1975 
 Yuri Borovskoy (born 1971), Russian professional football referee and a former player
 Andrei Fedkov (born 1971), Russian football player
 Svetlana Goncharenko (born 1971), Russian athlete
 Svetlana Boyko (born 1972), Russian foil fencer
 Sergey Markedonov (born 1972), Director of the Department for Problems of Ethnic Relations at the Institute for Political and Military Analysis in Moscow
 Andrei Redkin (born 1972), Russian football player
 Konstantin Tsuranov (born 1972), Russian sport shooter
 Oleg Vernigorov (born 1972), Russian football player
 Anatoly Morozov (born 1973), Russian professional football player and a coach
 Yekaterina Yusheva (born 1973), Russian fencer
 Vitaly Fokeev (born 1974), Russian sport shooter
 Aleksandr Kostoglod (born 1974), Russian sprint canoeist
 Ekaterina Kovalevskaya (born 1974), Russian chess player
 Serge Polyanichko (born 1974), Russian conductor, horn player and TV presenter
 Nikolay Spinyov (born 1974), Russian rower
 Vitali Tasenko (born 1975), Russian football player

1976–1980 
 Eduard Gritsun (born 1976), Russian professional road bicycle racer
 Angelina Nikonova (born 1976), Russian filmmaker, script writer and film producer
 Oksana Romenskaya (born 1976), Russian team handball player
 Maxim Staviski (born 1977), Russian-born naturalized Bulgarian ice dancer
 Yelena Dudnik (born 1978), Russian sport shooter
 Nina Kaptsova (born 1978), Russian prima ballerina of the Bolshoi Ballet
 Sergei Davydov (born 1979), Russian and Belarusian figure skater
 Aleksandr Galkin (born 1979), Russian chess grandmaster
 Andrey Moiseyev (born 1979), Russian pentathlete
 Varteres Samurgashev (born 1979), Armenian-Russian Greco-Roman wrestler
 Basta (born 1980), Russian rapper and RJ
 Ivan Dyagolchenko (born 1980), Russian professional footballer
 Sergey Fedorovtsev (born 1980), Russian rower
 Yulia Mayboroda (born 1980), Russian theater and film actress
 Yelena Produnova (born 1980), Russian competitive gymnast
 Tony Vilgotsky (born 1980), Russian (ethnically German) musician, composer, horror/fantasy writer and musical columnist

1981–1985 
 Anton Rogochiy (born 1982), Russian professional footballer
 Andrei Vorobyov (born 1982), Russian professional footballer
 Alexei Eremenko (born 1983), Russian-born Finnish professional footballer
 Pyotr Gitselov (born 1983), Russian-Swedish footballer
 Victoria Lopyreva (born 1983), Russian actress, model, TV Host, blogger and beauty pageant titleholder who won Miss Russia 2003
 Alexey Makovetskiy (born 1983), Russian rugby union footballer
 Yelena Rigert (born 1983), Russian female hammer thrower
 Igor Salov (born 1983), Russian rower
 Anastasia Sinitsyna (born 1983), Russian female handballer
 Victor Keyru (born 1984), Russian professional basketball player
 Oksana Pochepa (born 1984), Russian pop singer and model
 Marina Belikova (born 1985), Russian sport shooter
 Tatiana Kotova (born 1985), Russian singer, actress, television personality, winner of the title "Miss Russia 2006"
 Pavel Sviridenko (born 1985), Russian professional football player

1986–1990 
 Ivan Drannikov (born 1986), Russian professional footballer
 Valery Likhodey (born 1986), Russian professional basketball player
 Sergey Litvinov (born 1986), German and Russian hammer thrower
 Vladislav Ryazantsev (born 1986), Russian left-wing politician
 Aleksandr Abroskin (born 1987), Russian football striker
 Yekaterina Galitskaya (born 1987), Russian hurdler
 Antonina Krivoshapka (born 1987), Russian sprinter
 Andrei Mikheyev (born 1987), Russian professional football player
 Eva Rivas (born 1987), Russian-Armenian singer
 Yekaterina Tudegesheva (born 1987), Russian professional snowboarder
 Katerina Keyru (born 1988), Russian basketball shooting guard
 Maria Kryuchkova (1988–2015), Russian gymnast
 Vladimir Khozin (born 1989), Russian professional footballer
 Andrei Lyakh (born 1990), Russian professional football player
 Ivan Popov (born 1990), Russian chess grandmaster

1991–1995 
 Aleksandr Tumasyan (born 1992), Armenian football player
 Aleksey Denisenko (born 1993), Russian taekwondo practitioner
 Vlada Chigireva (born 1994), Russian competitor in synchronized swimming
 Anton Lazutkin (born 1994), Russian football player
 Igor Leontyev (born 1994), Russian football player
 Yulia Belokobylskaya (born 1995), Russian artistic gymnast
 Ivan Bukavshin (1995–2016), Russian chess Grandmaster
 Kasta (formed in 1995), Russian rap group
 Mikhail Puntov (born 1995), Russian singer

1996–2000 
 Mikhail Samarsky (born 1996), Russian writer, blogger and public figure
 Konstantin Tolokonnikov (born 1996), Russian middle distance runner
 Leo Goglichidze (born 1997), Russian football player of Georgian origin
 Nikita Nagornyy (born 1997), Russian artistic gymnast
 Maria Kharenkova (born 1998), Russian artistic gymnast
 Georgi Makhatadze (born 1998), Russian football player
 Vladimir Atoev (born 1999), Russian racing driver

21st century

2001–2010 
 Alisa Fedichkina (born 2002), Russian competitive figure skater
 Motorama (formed in 2005), Russian post-punk band
 Nikita Evstratov (born 2002), hockey goalie

Lived in Rostov-on-Don 
 Georgy Sedov (1877–1914), Russian Arctic explorer
 Evgeny Schwartz (1896–1958), Soviet writer and playwright
 Alexander Pechersky (1909–1990), one of the organizers, and the leader, of the most successful uprising and mass-escape of Jews from a Nazi extermination camp during World War II
 Aleksandr Solzhenitsyn (1918–2008), Russian novelist, historian and short story writer
 Svyatoslav Fyodorov (1927–2000), Russian ophthalmologist, politician, professor
 Natalia Duritskaya (born 1960), Russian painter

See also 

 List of Russian people
 List of Russian-language poets

Rostov-on-Don
Rostov-on-Don
List